Saints Cantius, Cantianus, and Cantianilla (all died May 31, circa 304 AD) are venerated as saints and martyrs by the Christian church.

Narrative
A late legend states that the three were orphaned siblings, members of a noble Roman family, the Anicii, and related to the Emperor Carinus. Protus was their tutor or guardian, and the Christian who converted the three siblings. When Diocletian began to persecute Christians, according to the legend, the four left Rome, selling their home and giving most of the proceeds to the poor. They reached their estate in Aquileia, where they had travelled to visit in his prison the holy priest Saint Chrysogonus. However, they were captured at a place called Aquae Gradatae (now called San Canzian d'Isonzo).  They were beheaded after they refused to offer sacrifice to the civic gods.

Veneration
A priest named Zoelus embalmed and buried their bodies at the site.  Saint Maximus of Turin subsequently preached a panegyric in their honor, and the saints are also mentioned by Venantius Fortunatus. His testimony, which he could draw from coeval documents, is very reliable, and states only that they were brothers of blood and that they were martyred together not far from Aquileia, while they were leaving from there in a chariot.  Their cult was anciently diffused in Lombardy, France, and Germany.  A paleochristian basilica and tomb was discovered at San Canzian in recent times; it contained the remains of three individuals.

References

External links

Saints of May 31: Cantius, Cantianius, and Cantianella

Groups of Christian martyrs of the Roman era
304 deaths
4th-century Christian saints
Year of birth unknown
Sibling trios
Anicii
Christians martyred during the reign of Diocletian